Tyler Smith (born April 3, 2001) is an American football offensive tackle for the Dallas Cowboys of the National Football League (NFL). He played college football at Tulsa and was selected by the Cowboys in the first round of the 2022 NFL Draft.

Early life and high school
Smith grew up in Fort Worth, Texas and attended North Crowley High School. He was rated a three-star recruit and initially committed to play college football at Abilene Christian. Smith decommitted and signed to play at Tulsa over offers from Houston, Navy, and New Mexico.

College career
Smith redshirted the 2019 season, playing in the final four games with two starts as a true freshman. In 2020, Smith started all nine games at left tackle for Tulsa during the team's COVID-19-shortened 2020 season and was named first-team all-American Athletic Conference (AAC). He also was named to the 2020 FWAA all-freshman team. In 2021, he started 12 of the Golden Hurricane's 13 games and was named second team All-AAC as a redshirt sophomore. Following the end of the season, he announced that he would forgo his remaining collegiate eligibility and enter the 2022 NFL Draft.

Professional career

Smith was selected by the Dallas Cowboys in the first round (24th overall) in the 2022 NFL Draft.

References

External links
 Dallas Cowboys bio
 Tulsa Golden Hurricane bio

2001 births
Living people
American football offensive tackles
Dallas Cowboys players
Players of American football from Fort Worth, Texas
Tulsa Golden Hurricane football players